N with long right leg (majuscule: Ƞ, minuscule: ƞ) is an obsolete letter of the Latin alphabet and the International Phonetic Alphabet.

 was used to represent the nasalization of vowels in the Lakota language in that language's 1982 orthography.

In the IPA, the letter  was used from 1951 to 1976 to transcribe a moraic nasal homorganic with a following consonant, but was removed because it did not indicate a specific phonetic pronunciation and the IPA consists of only glyphs with defined phonetic values. The wildcard letter capital N is often used for something similar today.

The lowercase form is graphically similar to the lowercase Greek letter eta, .

References

N with long right leg
Phonetic transcription symbols
Lakota culture